Maxim Nikolaevich Osipov (born April 15, 1980) is a Russian ice hockey centre. He currently plays for Neman Grodno in the Belarusian Extraleague.

External links

 

1980 births
Living people
HC CSKA Moscow players
HC Dynamo Moscow players
HC Neftekhimik Nizhnekamsk players
Krylya Sovetov Moscow players
Russian ice hockey forwards